The 1936 Chico State Wildcats football team represented Chico State College—now known as California State University, Chico—as a member of the Far Western Conference (FWC) during the 1936 college football season. Led by 14th-year head coach Art Acker, Chico State compiled an overall record of 1–6–1 with a mark of 0–4 in conference play, placing last out of five teams in the FWC. The team was outscored by its opponents 137 to 44 for the season. The Wildcats played home games at College Field in Chico, California.

Schedule

Notes

References

Chico State
Chico State Wildcats football seasons
Chico State Wildcats football